KDHL (920 AM) is a radio station broadcasting a Classic Country format.  Licensed to Faribault, Minnesota, United States, the station is currently owned by Townsquare Media and features programming from ABC News Radio.

On August 30, 2013, a deal was announced in which Townsquare Media would acquire 53 stations from Cumulus Media, including KDHL, for $238 million. The deal was part of Cumulus' acquisition of Dial Global; Townsquare and Dial Global were both controlled by Oaktree Capital Management. The sale to Townsquare was completed on November 14, 2013.

References

External links

Radio stations in Minnesota
Townsquare Media radio stations
Classic country radio stations in the United States
Radio stations established in 1948
1948 establishments in Minnesota